Shirene Human (born 9 January 1980 in Johannesburg) is a South African former competitive figure skater. A nine-time national champion, she competed at the 1998 Winter Olympics, six World Championships, and seven Four Continents Championships. She qualified for the free skate at the Olympics in Nagano, Japan, and at the 2000 World Championships in Nice, France, finishing 24th at both events.

Programs

Results

References

External links

 

South African female single skaters
Olympic figure skaters of South Africa
Figure skaters at the 1998 Winter Olympics
Living people
1980 births
Sportspeople from Johannesburg